Dmitrović is a Serbian surname. Notable people with the surname include:

Boban Dmitrović (born 1972), Serbian football manager and former player
Filip Dmitrović (born 1995), Serbian footballer
Ljubiša Dmitrović (born 1969), Serbian football manager and former player
Marina Dmitrović (born 1985), Serbian handballer
Marko Dmitrović (born 1992), Serbian footballer

Serbian surnames
Slavic-language surnames
Patronymic surnames
Surnames from given names